Rondebosch Park is a park in Rondebosch, Cape Town, South Africa. It is located on the corner of Campground Road and Sandown Road. The park is laid out with avenues of trees, and is used for regular craft markets and a Potter's Market held twice a year, usually on March and November. The park was originally owned by the Rondebosch and Mowbray municipalities and is subsidized by the local government.

History
The park was opened in 1870, when it was still a part of the Rondebosch Common. The park was split up later that year by the local municipality.

References

External links
 Rondebosch Park

Parks in Cape Town
Rondebosch